Dominick Browne, 1st Baron Oranmore and Browne PC (28 May 1787 – 30 January 1860), was an Irish politician.

Browne was the son of Dominick Geoffrey Browne and his wife Margaret. She was the daughter of the Hon. George Browne, 4th son of John, 1st Earl of Altamont. His sister Henrietta (1789–1862) married Henry, Viscount Dillon and was ancestral to Clementine (the wife of Winston Churchill) and to the Mitford sisters.

He sat as Member of Parliament for County Mayo from 1814 to 1826 and from 1830 to 1836 and was admitted to the Irish Privy Council in 1834. In 1836 he was raised to the Peerage of Ireland as Baron Oranmore and Browne, of Carrabrowne Castle in the County of the Town of Galway and of Castle Macgarret in the County of Mayo.

Lord Oranmore and Browne married Catherine Anne Isabella, daughter of Henry Monck, in 1811. He died in January 1860, aged 72, and was succeeded in the barony by his son Geoffrey. Lady Oranmore and Browne died in 1865. Another son was William Montague Browne (1823–1883) an Officer in the Confederate States Army.

Notes

References
Kidd, Charles, Williamson, David (editors). Debrett's Peerage and Baronetage (1990 edition). New York: St Martin's Press, 1990.

External links 
 

1787 births
1860 deaths
Barons in the Peerage of Ireland
Peers of Ireland created by William IV
Members of the Parliament of the United Kingdom for County Mayo constituencies (1801–1922)
UK MPs 1812–1818
UK MPs 1818–1820
UK MPs 1820–1826
UK MPs 1830–1831
UK MPs 1831–1832
UK MPs 1832–1835
UK MPs 1835–1837
UK MPs who were granted peerages
Politicians from County Mayo
Politicians from County Galway
Members of the Privy Council of Ireland